was a  after Bunji and before Shōji. This period spanned the years from April 1190 through April 1199.

Change of era
 1190 : The new era name was created to mark an event or a number of events. The previous era ended and a new one commenced in Bunji 6, on the 14th day of the 8th month of 1185.

Events of the Kenkyū era
 1192 (Kenkyū 3, 13th day of the 3rd month): The former-Emperor Go-Shirakawa died at the age of 66. He had been father or grandfather to five emperors -- Emperor Nijō, the 78th emperor; Emperor Rokujō, the 79th emperor; Emperor Takakura, the 80th emperor; Emperor Antoku, the 81st emperor; and Go-Toba, the 82nd emperor.
 1192 (Kenkyū 3, 12th day of the 7th month): Minamoto no Yoritomo is named commander-in-chief of the forces to fight the barbarians.
 1195 (Kenkyū 6, 4th day of the 3rd month): Shōgun Yoritomo revisits the capital.
 1198 (Kenkyū 9, 11th day of the 1st month): In the 15th year of Go-Toba-tennōs reign (後鳥天皇15年), the emperor abdicated; and the succession (senso) was received by his eldest son.
 1198 (Kenkyū 9, 3rd month): Emperor Tsuchimikado is said to have acceded to the throne (sokui).
 1199 (Kenkyū 10, 13th day of the 1st month): Shōgun Yoritomo dies at age 53 in Kamakura.

See also
 Mumyōzōshi, a text on literary criticism also known as Kenkyū Monogatari

Notes

References
 Brown, Delmer and Ichiro Ishida. (1979). The Future and the Past: a translation and study of the 'Gukanshō', an interpretative history of Japan written in 1219.  Berkeley: University of California Press. ;  OCLC 5145872
 Kitagawa, Hiroshi and Bruce T. Tsuchida, eds. (1975). The Tale of the Heike. Tokyo: University of Tokyo Press. 	; ; ; ;  OCLC 193064639
 Nussbaum, Louis-Frédéric and Käthe Roth. (2005).  Japan encyclopedia. Cambridge: Harvard University Press. ;  OCLC 58053128
 Titsingh, Isaac. (1834). Nihon Ōdai Ichiran; ou,  Annales des empereurs du Japon.  Paris: Royal Asiatic Society, Oriental Translation Fund of Great Britain and Ireland. OCLC 5850691
 Varley, H. Paul. (1980). A Chronicle of Gods and Sovereigns: Jinnō Shōtōki of Kitabatake Chikafusa. New York: Columbia University Press. ;  OCLC 6042764

External links
 National Diet Library, "The Japanese Calendar" -- historical overview plus illustrative images from library's collection

Japanese eras
1190s in Japan